Islamic Republic of Iran Army Day (Persian: روز ارتش جمهوری اسلامی ایران) is a national holiday of Iran, celebrated annually on April 18. The day of the Iranian Army has been celebrated since 1921.

History 
The current holiday was established by the former Supreme Leader of Iran, Ruhollah Khomeini on April 18, 1979. Previously, Army Day was celebrated on February 21 (Esfand 3) to commemorate the 1921 Persian coup d'état during the Qajar era. The holiday was moved to December 12 (Azar 28) in 1946 by Mohammad Reza Pahlavi as it was the date when the Imperial Iranian Army defeated the Soviet-backed Azerbaijan People's Government.

On April 8, 1979, two months after the fall of the Shah, Khomeini met with Iranian Armed Forces soldiers who made an invaluable contribution to the victory of the revolution. Ten days later, Khomeini named 18 April as Army Day, during a speech to the people calling for military parades to exhibit the nation's military preparedness.

Celebrations 
The Iranian government makes a show of military force on Iran Army Day with parades every 18 April, often demonstrating new defense technologies. Army veterans, active servicemen and reservists, also take part in the annually held parade. The parade is held in front of the Mausoleum of Ruhollah Khomeini.

Gallery

See also 
Public holidays in Iran
Armed Forces Day

Videos 
 Iranian Army Day 2018

References 

Armed Forces days
Military of Iran
Public holidays in Iran
Spring (season) events in Iran